St. John's Episcopal Church is a historic church at the southeast corner of Buffalo and Summit in Girard, Kansas, United States.  It was built in 1888 in Late Gothic Revival style and added to the National Register of Historic Places in 2009.

In 2008 the church was used by the Museum of Crawford County. In 2018 the church began being used as the Girard History Museum, and is operated by the Friends of Historic Girard & Girard History Museum.

References

Churches in Crawford County, Kansas
Episcopal church buildings in Kansas
Gothic Revival church buildings in Kansas
Churches on the National Register of Historic Places in Kansas
Churches completed in 1888
19th-century Episcopal church buildings
National Register of Historic Places in Crawford County, Kansas